Edinburgh Central may refer to:

 Edinburgh Central (Scottish Parliament constituency), a constituency of the Scottish Parliament, at Holyrood, 1999 to present
 Edinburgh Central (UK Parliament constituency), a constituency of the House of Commons of the Parliament of the United Kingdom, at Westminster, 1885 to 2005